Saint-Laurent is an unincorporated community in Gloucester County, New Brunswick, Canada.

History

Notable people

See also
List of communities in New Brunswick

References

Communities in Gloucester County, New Brunswick
Designated places in New Brunswick